Merrivale is a town in Umgungundlovu District Municipality in the KwaZulu-Natal province of South Africa.

Village 145 km north-west of Durban and 5 km south-east of Howick. Named after Herman Merivale, Secretary of State for the Colonies in 1848.

References

Populated places in the uMngeni Local Municipality